Grosjean v. American Press Co., 297 U.S. 233 (1936), was a decision of the United States Supreme Court over a challenge to a separate sales tax on newspapers with circulation of over 20,000.

Background 
U.S. Senator Huey Long received more support in rural areas whereas the larger urban newspapers tended to be more critical of him. In 1934, his political allies levied a 2% gross receipts tax in an attempt to tax newspapers critical of him into submission. Nine publishers representing 13 newspapers impacted by the tax sued in federal court.

Decision 
The Supreme Court, in a unanimous decision, found the tax unconstitutional. The decision held that states could charge customary taxes on media but higher taxes ran afoul of the First Amendment. Specifically, the court found the law similar to the British Stamp Act of 1712 in that it would suppress free speech through taxation and allowing a similar law would be against the clear Founders' Intent of the Bill of Rights. Justice George Sutherland wrote that "the revolution really began when, in 1765, that government sent stamps for newspaper duties to the American colonies."

The case is often cited because it defined corporations as "persons" for purposes of analysis under the Equal Protection clause.

The Court stated, "The predominant purpose of the grant of immunity here invoked was to preserve an untrammeled press as a vital source of public information. The newspapers, magazines and other journals of the country, it is safe to say, have shed and continue to shed, more light on the public and business affairs of the nation than any other instrumentality of publicity, and, since informed public opinion is the most potent of all restraints upon misgovernment, the suppression or abridgment of the publicity afforded by a free press cannot be regarded otherwise than with grave concern. The tax here involved is bad not because it takes money from the pockets of the appelles. If that were all, a wholly different question would be presented. It is bad because, in the light of its history and of its present setting, it is seen to be a deliberate and calculated device in the guise of a tax to limit the circulation of information to which the public is entitled in virtue of the constitutional guaranties. A free press stands as one of the great interpreters between the government and the people. To allow it to be fettered is to fetter ourselves."

See also
List of United States Supreme Court cases, volume 297

References

Further reading

External links

United States Free Speech Clause case law
United States Supreme Court cases
United States Supreme Court cases of the Hughes Court
United States taxation and revenue case law
1936 in United States case law
Legal history of Louisiana
1936 in Louisiana
Sales taxes
Huey Long
United States equal protection case law
Mass media in Louisiana